Will Clark is an American baseball player.

Will Clark may also refer to:

 Will Clark (actor) (born 1968), performer in gay porn films

See also
 Will Clarke (disambiguation)
 William Clark (disambiguation)